These are the official results of the Men's 200 metres event at the 1993 IAAF World Championships in Stuttgart, Germany. There were a total number of 87 participating athletes, with nine qualifying heats and the final held on Friday 1993-08-20.

Final

Semifinals
Held on 1993-08-19

Quarterfinals
Held on Thursday 1993-08-19

Qualifying heats
Held on Tuesday 1993-08-17

See also
 1992 Men's Olympic 200 metres

References
 Results

 
200 metres at the World Athletics Championships